Nepenthes maximoides is a tropical pitcher plant endemic to Luzon, Philippines bringing the total number of Nepenthes species in this island to eight, with all but one is endemic. Nepenthes maximoides closely resembled N. maxima in its large, spectacular and narrowly funnel-shaped upper pitchers, and the lids have a recurved basal and filiform appendages not seen in any other Philippine species.

References

Carnivorous plants of Asia
maximoides
Plants described in 2020
Endemic flora of the Philippines
Taxa named by Martin Cheek